In United States tax law history, the  Tariff of 1883 (signed into law on March 3, 1883), also known as the Mongrel Tariff Act by its critics, reduced high tariff rates only marginally, and left in place fairly strong protectionist barriers.

President Chester A. Arthur appointed a commission in May 1882 to recommend how much tariff rates should be reduced.  The issue was controversial during the last three decades of the nineteenth century, making tariff revision a daunting task.  Different constituents argued for opposite measures, often wanting to maintain tariffs on some items while reducing them on others.  Support or opposition to tariffs often broke down along regional lines.

In December 1882, the commission argued for substantial reductions.  Protectionists in Congress by this time recognized that some type of reduction would be politically popular, but wanted to avoid a drastic cut.  Lame-duck Republicans wanted to ensure that a tariff reduction passed before incumbent Democrats assumed control of Congress in the next session and lowered rates by a greater margin.

The result was an enormously complicated and unpopular piece of legislation with no clear vision.  Tariffs on some items were lowered.  Others were inexplicably raised.  Some goods had multiple tariffs rates placed on them to be applied in different locations with no clear reasoning.  Tariff rates were reduced an average 1.47 percent, with most rates remaining around 35-40 percent.

President Arthur was not the most enthusiastic supporter of tariff reduction, but he did feel that some meaningful reduction was needed and he recognized that the changes made by the "Mongrel Tariff" were insufficient. Thus, he directed U.S. Secretary of State Frederick Theodore Frelinghuysen to establish reciprocal trade agreements with other nations, especially those with raw material the U.S. needed. The reciprocal trade agreements allowed Arthur to amend the tariff without having to involve himself in a congressional battle over the issue.

Nix v. Hedden
The law exempts fruit but not vegetables, causing tomato importers to file sue claiming that tomatoes are a fruit, resulting in the unanimous U.S. Supreme Court decision in Nix v. Hedden (May 10, 1893) that tomatoes are to be considered a vegetable for purposes of this tariff.

References

Further reading

United States federal trade legislation
1883 in American law
March 1883 events
1883 in the United States